The Japanese plane or  is a plane pulled towards the user rather than pushed in the manner of western style planes. They are made of hardwood, usually Japanese white or red oak. The laminated steel and iron blade is stout compared to western planes. Tapered in length and thickness, the plane blade is its own wedge, as it fits into a correspondingly-shaped mortice in the body of the plane, thus dispensing the need for a separate wedge to hold the blade in place, as is the case in most other traditional wooden planes. The chip breaker is held in place with a simple nail inserted some distance away from and perpendicular to the axis of the main blade. The chip breaker is not tapered like the main blade; instead, it has bent "ears" that bear down on the plane blade. Chip breakers in Japan were introduced relatively recently, during the Meiji period. The soles of Japanese planes also have different configurations for varying applications. The apparently simple design disguises a great deal of complexity.

Types
  is the usual type of flat plane used for smoothing wood. There are several types, depending on the level of finish.
  is used for the first planing.
 .
 .
  is used for finishing work.
  is a shoulder plane. The blade is angled and inserted into the centre of the plane block at an angle.
  is a groove plane used for cutting kamoi and shikii (see fusuma).
  is a plane with a convex base used for scooping out curved surfaces.
 is used to plane the surface of other planes. Its blade is held at 90 degrees to its base.
 is a spear-like plane, the original plane used in the most ancient buildings. Its use has been revived in Japanese temple carpentry.
 is a spokeshave with two handles.
 is a push style kanna. These planes existed historically in Japan.

The name changes from kanna to ganna are due to rendaku.

See also

Japanese carpentry

References

External links

Japanese plane at the Takenaka carpentry tools museum

Planes
Planes